Richardson is a large lunar impact crater located on the Moon's far side, just behind the eastern limb. It lies to the south of the huge walled plain Harkhebi, and to the east-southeast of the crater Vestine. Just to the northeast is Szilard, and to the southeast is Artamonov.

A substantial portion of the crater is overlain by Maxwell, which lies across the rim to the southwest. The northeastern rim of Maxwell reaches the approximate midpoint of Richardson, and together with the outer rampart covers nearly half the interior floor. The remainder of the rim of Richardson is worn and eroded, with Richardson W intruding into the northwestern rim and Richardson E lying along the eastern side.

The surviving interior floor of Richardson is relatively level, but marked with a number of small craterlets. The rim and interior floor is covered by a number of wispy deposits from the Giordano Bruno impact, located just to the north-northeast.

Prior to formal naming in 1979 by the IAU, this crater was known as Crater 114.

Satellite craters
By convention these features are identified on lunar maps by placing the letter on the side of the crater midpoint that is closest to Richardson.

References

 
 
 
 
 
 
 
 
 
 
 
 

Impact craters on the Moon